Samaratungga was the head of the Sailendra dynasty who ruled Mataram Kingdom and Srivijaya in the 8th and the 9th century. He was the successor of King Indra, and his name was mentioned in Karangtengah inscription dated 824 CE as the constructor of a sacred Buddhist building called Venuvana (Sanskrit: bamboo forest) to place the cremated ashes of his predecessor King Indra of Sailendra. During his administration, he initiated the construction of a massive Buddhist monument Borobudur. Samaratungga married Dewi Tara, the princess of Srivijayan ruler Dharmasetu, which created close political alliance between the Sailendras and Srivijaya.

Samaratungga had one son by the name of Balaputra and one daughter Pramodhawardhani. After Samaratungga died, Pramodhawardhani married the Shivaite Rakai Pikatan from Sanjaya dynasty. Rakai Pikatan managed to usurp Balaputra's authority over Central Java and forced the Saleidras to flee Java for Srivijaya.

Under the reign of Samaratungga too, Jayavarman II was appointed as the governor of Indrapura in the Mekong delta. Jayavarman later revoked his allegiance to the Sailedras and Srivijaya to form the Khmer Empire.

References

Indonesian Buddhist monarchs
Shailendra dynasty
Srivijaya
Central Java
9th-century Indonesian people
Borobudur